Abu Dhabi Film Commission (ADFC) is a government agency formed to support the development of Abu Dhabi's film and TV industry. Its mission is to promote the Emirate of Abu Dhabi as a production destination to generate economic benefits for the region and increased job opportunity for its residences. It was established under twofour54 Abu Dhabi in 2009.

As part of their efforts to increase film productions in the region, Abu Dhabi Film Commission provides services to production companies such as location scouting, location surveys, script breakdowns, script approval, custom clearance, digital location library, and assistance with film and work permits.

Incentives
The Abu Dhabi Film Commission offers an international production incentive scheme that provides a refund of up to 30% on productions done in Abu Dhabi, including feature films, television dramas, commercials, music videos, other television formats, post-production, digital content services and visual effects services.

Notable Films and Television Programs made in Abu Dhabi
Notable Films and Television Programs made in Abu Dhabi are:

1. 	Star Wars: Episode VII - The Force Awakens (2015)

2. 	Furious 7 (2015)

3. 	The Bold and the Beautiful (1987 TV Series)

4. 	The Bold and the Beautiful (1987 TV Series)
Episode: Episode #1.6848 (2014)

5. 	The Bold and the Beautiful (1987 TV Series)
Episode: Episode #1.6835 (2014)

6. 	The Bold and the Beautiful (1987 TV Series)
Episode: Episode #1.6838 (2014)

7. 	The Bold and the Beautiful (1987 TV Series)
Episode: Episode #1.6836 (2014)

8. 	The Bold and the Beautiful (1987 TV Series)
Episode: Episode #1.6837 (2014)

9. 	The Bold and the Beautiful (1987 TV Series)
Episode: Episode #1.6847 (2014)

10. 	The Bold and the Beautiful (1987 TV Series)
Episode: Episode #1.6841 (2014)
11. 	Top Gear (2002 TV Series)
Episode: Episode #21.4 (2014)

12. 	Top Gear (2002 TV Series)
Episode: Episode #21.5 (2014)

13. 	Deliver Us from Evil (2014)

14. 	The Amazing Race (2001 TV Series)
Episode: Part Like the Red Sea (2013)

15. 	The Amazing Race (2001 TV Series)
Episode: Speed Dating Is the Worst (2013)
16. 	The Amazing Race (2001 TV Series)
Episode: One Hot Camel (2013)
17. 	Dilwale (2015)
18. 	The Kingdom (2007)
19. 	Bang Bang (2014)
20. 	Baby (2015)
21. 	Welcome Back (2015)
22. 	From A to B (2014)
23. 	Jeff Dunham: All Over the Map (2014 TV Special)
24. 	Cranium Intel (2016)
25. 	The Wicked Path (2017)
26. 	The Amazing Race Australia (2011 TV Series)
Episode: Episode #2.4 (2012)
27. 	Dil Vil Pyar Vyar (2002)
28. 	Das Traumhotel (2004 TV Series)
Episode: Dubai - Abu Dhabi (2007)
29. 	Take Me Home (2016 Short Film)
30. 	Sea Shadow (2011)
31. 	Tinseltown TV (2002 TV Series)
32. 	The Brain That Sings (2013 Documentary)
33. 	F=ma (2012 Video)
34. 	The Arab, The Camel, and P. Madhavan Nair (2011)
35. 	/Drive on NBCSN (2014 TV Series)
Episode: McLaren (2014)
36. 	8 Hours (2014 TV Movie)
37. 	The Diamond Queen (2012 TV Series)
Episode: Episode #1.1 (2012)
38. 	Packup (2013 Short Film)
39. 	The Orphanage (2012 Short Film)
40. 	Insane Coaster Wars (2012 TV Series)
Episode: World's Fastest Coaster (2013)
41. 	Tba (2010 Short Film)
42. 	Feathered Cocaine (2010 Documentary)
43. 	Ian Thorpe: The Swimmer (2012 Documentary)
44. 	Justice: Qalb Al Adala (2016 TV Series)
Abu Dhabi
45. 	Kismet: How Turkish Soap Operas Change the World (2014 Documentary)
46. 	Sarkar Sahab Aka Evicted Lord (2007 TV Series)
47. 	Detroit Rising (????)
48. 	The Plan (2010 Documentary)
49. 	Ramadan E Kareem (2013 Short Film)
50. 	Sunset State (2013 Short Film)

References

Film organisations in the United Arab Emirates
2009 establishments in the United Arab Emirates